King is a Canadian animated television series produced by Decode Entertainment and Funbag Animation Studios that aired on Family Channel between August 15, 2003 and March 19, 2005.

Plot
Russell Wright is a young boy who finds a portal under his bed that leads to an alternate universe called Under. As he is from 'Up' (i.e., the regular world) and acquires the crown of Under, he is proclaimed the King.

Most episodes have multiple subplots, and deal with villain Bob Wire's attempts of stealing the crown and becoming king himself; however, he is regularly foiled by Russell and/or his friends. Other recurring themes are the attempts of Cliff, who was the former king of Under, to bully Russell into handing over the crown while he's in Up; and various confrontations between Under and the neighboring country of Near Under. Added to this are issues involving monsters, money, environmental issues, and even time travel.<ref>{{IMDb title|id=tt0405560|title=King (TV Series 2003– )'}}</ref>

Characters

 Heroes 
Russell Wright (Mark Rendall) — Russell moves into a new house with his family, comprising his older sister Lou, and his parents (the father was only seen briefly in short scenes throughout the series). Thanks to Gus (and Cliff, technically), Russell discovers the passageway beneath his bed in the turret room (which he chose after unknowingly seeing Vernon's eye-looker probe in the window) and uses it to descend to Under. There he befriends Loopy and Vernon, and challenges Bob Wire for the crown, subsequently becoming Under's new king. Surprisingly, he is a smart and righteous ruler of Under in contrast to other former rulers, despite the fact he's only 12 at the onset of season 1. The crown confers upon the wearer certain abilities, at least one of which is the ability to breathe underwater, as long as the crown is being worn. It is assumed these abilities only work in Under.

Gus (James Kee) — a West Highland White Terrier, who can talk with a Scottish accent in Under (where dogs, cats, and possibly other Up animals are sapient). He is "doggedly" loyal to Russell and his friends, and is very brave, sarcastic, blunt, and gutsy, often taking on (and usually scaring away) much larger foes.

Loopy (Adam Greydon Reid) — one of Russell's subjects, who displays effeminate and cowardly tendencies, such as being obsessed with butterflies, Shoosh-Bangs (fireworks), and the name "Gack" (which he wishes to name everything from pet animals to Up). He is part of the royal court as Under's First Buffoonist. He is also shown to be so stupid that Brain Suckers do not affect him. Loopy does come through for Under in his own special way: he has the inherent ability to tame almost any animal, from squumps to sky cows to various undersea creatures. Loopy and Vernon are best friends, despite their slapping and bickering now and again.

Vernon (Robert Tinkler) — one of Russell's subjects, who is an android built by the Clockmaker and is also part of the royal court as Under's figurer-outer and gizmologist. He is immune to most things that happen in the realm, as he's made of metal. Unlike Loopy, Vernon is a genius inventor, and their differences often lead to sibling-esque slap-fights.

Ex-Princess Populah (Julie Lemieux) — a former princess, who used to be the ruler of Near Under but "gave it up" because it was "too much trouble" (as revealed in the episode "Ex-Princess Up a Tree"). This is reasonable as Near Underites are quite demanding and fickle, difficult for their leaders to rule. She is related to Auntie First. (Although everyone calls her "Auntie", First has confirmed her relation to Populah by referring to her as her "favorite niece"). She is also a blood relative of Cousin Tess (although everyone calls her "Cousin", in the same way as everyone calls Auntie First "Auntie"). She speaks with a Southern accent and is very athletic. She can breathe underwater naturally, without the need of the crown, as can Cousin Tess.

 Villains 
Cliff (Robert Tinkler) — the former King of Under. Cliff is a bully who constantly picks on Russell because he wants to be king again.  Sometimes he attempts to sneak into Russell's room (and down to Under) while he's away, usually being foiled by Russell's teenage sister Lou (Voiced by Stacey DePass) or his own stupidity. He has a sister named Sissy who is affectionate towards Russell, which only makes Cliff angrier.

Bob Wire (Cathal J. Dodd) — Cliff's former right-hand man, who has taken to trying to make himself king of Under by stealing the Crown from Russell. He is made out of coils of metal barbed wire (hence the pun on his name), and like Vernon, he is immune to most things that happen to him in Under. His plans generally tend to be rather badly thought out and self-defeating, but he usually bounces back when he is defeated. The few things he is good at are singing, high finance, and show business.

Frags (Robert Tinkler and James Kee) — Two small green creatures (there were several in the original few episodes) who are henchmen of Bob Wire. They tend to be extremely lazy and are generally somewhat more intelligent than their boss. They sometimes take the side of Russell or one of his companions. Their voices are high pitched but randomly switch to low pitched in a manner akin to croaking.

Auntie First (Marnie McPhail) — the narcissistic, self-absorbed, oppressive despot of Near Under. Not very good at her job but maintains it nevertheless, generally through a combination of threatening bodily harm, bribery, and blackmailing. She is referred to as "Auntie" by everyone, even those who are not related to her (except by Captain Darling, who instead calls her "ma'am"). She and Bob often team up to try and defeat Russell.

Captain Darling (James Kee) — Auntie First's beloved and loyal right-hand man. Darling will do anything to help Auntie, even if it means teaming up with her enemies, like Russell. He's in charge of the Near Under's By The Book Brigade. He's a very polite man, always apologizing to somebody when jailing them, and even when expelling people from Near Under.  Speaks with an English accent. Unlike the rest of the cast, he calls Auntie First "ma'am". He wears a British police uniform and pink fuzzy slippers.

 Other rulers 
Cousin Tess (Alison Sealy-Smith) — Ruler of Undersea (capital city: Bubble Town). She and Auntie First used to wage war on each other because they wore the same dress to a formal dance when they were in Despot School. Captain Darling put an end to the fighting by colorizing an old home video of the two fighting, deceptively coloring the dresses in different colors. Regardless, Auntie and Tess still fight all the time as a hobby, and as Populah puts it, "they enjoy hating each other".

Hugh the Yu-Yu (Maurice Dean Wint) — Ruler of Under Under. He rules over the Yu-Yus (despite not being one himself) and Slythers (including his pet Slyther, Mavis). He is very hippie-like, loves to party, and goes where life takes him, rolling a pair of fuzzy dice to make his decisions (even if it means disaster).

"The Queen" — Ruler of Throng (on the continent of Ahead of Under). Like her people, the Queen (whose name has not been revealed in the show) has a phobia of germs, uncleanliness, and pretty much everything else. Bob worked for her in one episode, reversing her continent's direction to cure their motion sickness, by facing their sofas the other way, making it nearly flatten Under and causing Russell to intervene.

King Lugobrius Rex — Ruler of the Empire of Flax. He summons many entertainers to his abode, and if they fail to please him, he then has them shaved naked and thrown in his dungeons forever. So far only Bob Wire's act, in which he inadvertently puts himself through large amounts of pain, has made Lugobrius laugh. He only speaks in wet burps, and is surrounded by massive Gordilators who do his bidding.

 Past kings of Under 

King Cliff the Grim was the king before Russell. He was immensely unpopular in Under (except the Valley of the Outies, where he was worshiped for defeating the Great Big Gehh); one of his more disliked actions was the outlawing of numbers (he was sub-literate). He was called Grim for his poor hygiene as well as his immature and selfish personality. Bob Wire was Cliff's right-hand man before he succeeded him after Cliff moved away in Up.
Kings Matt and Pat were twin kings that ruled Under before Cliff. They constantly fought over the crown and neglected their kingly duties, leading Under into disastrous and monster-plagued times. Vernon made a second crown so each twin could have one, but the plan failed as they promptly started fighting over the second one, ignoring the first one.
King Hobart - A young king who ran away after Loopy gave him an extra leg on a previous King Appreciation Day, allowing him to sprint at amazing speed. Since Vernon and Loopy never saw Hobart again after he ran out of the castle, it might be possible he never returned to Up, and it is not known what his parents did about his disappearance. This also poses the problem that he took the crown with him, meaning another one had to be constructed.
King Baxter - When Loopy gave Ex-King Baxter extra fingers as a King Appreciation Day gift, he ran away and joined an insurance company in Up, becoming a "top-notch typist".
King Rocko - A teenage-looking King of whom Bob Wire was not particularly fond, as Rocko would often beat him and tie him up.
"King Bob Wire"- There have been some occasions where Bob did succeed in stealing the crown from Russell, though none of his reigns lasted longer than a day, if not a few hours. His longest known rule happened when Thornhop locked out Russell in Up, taking Bob's voice as payment for his service. The Frags remarked that Bob would then be tagged "King Bob Wire the Silent", but Russell returned and soon set things right. However, the reign he had after King Cliff moved away may have been longer. Bob is shown to be tyrannical in his own way; once he ordered everyone in Under to belch, which they promptly did. In some episodes, Bob did not desire to be king but thrived for the next greatest thing, such as being the top performer of the circus or a successful entrepreneur of his own talk show.
"King Loopy" - When Auntie First was imprinted on Loopy due to one of Bob's schemes, Loopy had her steal back the Crown from Bob. Loopy was later seen wearing the crown, meaning he was King of Under, though no one (not even himself) seemed to address the fact. When Russell asked for the Crown back, Loopy immediately returned it, ending his "reign".

 Non-Kingdom places 

The world Under, where the show takes place, is made up of three different continents. Under (where the Kingdoms of Under and Near Under, and the Empire of Flax are located), Ahead-of-Under and Before-Under. The caverns below the continent of Under Sea are called Under Under, and the ocean surrounding all the lands is called either Under Sea or the Sassafras Sea (though Under Sea may refer to Cousin Tess' underwater realm only, i.e. excluding all the islands, etc.). Unless otherwise stated, the places below take place in the Kingdom of Under (not to be confused with the central town of Under surrounding the castle). Also, all islands are located on the Sassafras Sea.

Wire Keep - Bob Wire's home, resembling barbed wire.
Quithering Forest - A Forest with trees that launch into the air when their safety is threatened. The Underites call this 'Quithering'. Home of Populah's treehouse.
Flatulent Swamp - A swamp with many foul-smelling plants and animals. Known as Under's top tourist attraction.
The Floating Mountains - A mountain range outside of Under (the town), the mountains are within the Kingdom's borders but are also visible from Near Under. As the name says, the mountains float. The exact mechanism that keeps the mountains afloat is a mystery. Early in the series, Vernon said that as far as he could tell the mountains are kept up by "sheer stubbornness", although it was later revealed that the rocks themselves are lighter than air, though they stop floating when the sun goes down, becoming regular mountains until the next sunrise.
Frolicking Island - This island is advertised as a tropical paradise resort and spa, but it isn’t anything but that. It is an extremely poorly run and effectively prison, where the only people having any fun are the people running it. It is a tourist trap.
Horrible Caverns - Caverns of Under Under. Home to the Night Slythers, horrible monsters with mouths on each hand. Other sections of Under Underplay host to plain Slythers and housed Under's plumbing.
Wall Eye - A gargantuan, continually weeping eye set in a cliff-face. The source of almost all the monsters in Under.
The Moon - Under's Moon. Formerly used as Under's trash dump until the combined weight of all the garbage threatened to cause the moon to crash into Under, forcing Russell to whack it far away from the planet. The only resident is a kooky and chatty hermit and his once-strayed dog.
Argyle Flats - A "wild-western" area inhabited by Sock Boys and wild Squumps. It borders Under (and presumably Near Under as well).
Time Town - A giant metallic-like with the mechanisms of a clock. Only one person, The Clock Maker, lives there. He is also the one who invented Vernon and is usually sought out to help repair him.
Outieville - A jungle valley. The villagers all have outie belly-buttons and used to worship King Cliff for driving off the Great Big Geh.
Miss Atilla's School for Lady Despots- A despot training school that Populah is sent to by Auntie First and Cousin Tess (both of whom graduated from it) so she will live up to the family name of being a horrible tyrant. Their motto is "To cheat is to win, and to win is to cheat". It may be located in some sort of neutral territory, as both Underites and Near Underites can attend.
Unclimbable Mountain - A pink mountain. If someone almost reaches the top, a nasty troll makes the mountain grow. As a result, it is unclimbable. However, "King Bob Wire" did manage to conquer it through sheer desperation to get away from Auntie First. See "King Loopy" under Past Kings of Under.
Bottomless Pit - A pit in the ground that is never-ending. Some people choose to jump into the pit with their belongings and live out their lives in constant freefall, as part of a recent trendy new lifestyle. There is a basket attached to a rope and winch next to it for those who wish to contact the pit's residents.
Volcano Metamorpho - A Sea Volcano where Plurns go through the vents and erupt into bird-like creatures. Also, the victims of being inked by a Plurn can return to normal via the same procedure.
Hot-Diggidy Desert - A desert which is probably in neutral territory, as Auntie First once used it to conduct peace-talks with Russell.
Rolling Hills - Hills with large grassy spheres rolling perpetually up and down. Again, the exact mechanism that keeps the balls rolling is a mystery.
Equatorial Glaciers - Giant pillars of ice on tropical beach shores located at Under's equator and far away from the Kingdoms of Under and Near Under. People are never sure whether they should wear parkas or swimsuits when they visit here.
Grim Island - Loopy's fortress of evil when he was playing The Grimzer, a character from one of Russell's comic books. Once Russell decided to forgo posing as the superhero The Coyote, Loopy returned to normal and the Island fortress was destroyed by an encapsulated Zombie Swamp Leech (created by Bob Wire).
Uncertain City - Ancient abandoned city within Near Under that appears and disappears from existence at random, anyone in it, when it disappears, goes with it, not knowing when they will return. Its inhabitants left long ago and founded (the town of) Under.
GeeIForget River - A river containing water that causes you to forget everything if you fall in, hence the name. The memories are then washed downstream to the Cave of the Recollector, a large immobilized monster who generally refuses to relinquish any of his collected memories.
Chimney Mountains - A barren area consisting only of huge chimney stacks with lava inside.
West Pole - The West Pole of Under. When it is electromagnetically charged with positive energy, it emits the Horrorborealis, which turns all organic beings into Ghouls as long as it is in the sky.
Hole Island - An island inhabited by pirates. Has an enormous treasure hole beneath a round land bridge; the pirates believe that if they dig deep enough, they'll find treasure.
Dandylion Cliff - the only known places in Ahead-of-Under are Dandylion Cliff (located at the continent's edge facing Under) and Throng (a town). The only known local wildlife are gerbil mice and bedrock beasts.
Tower of Derision - A sentient tower that insults people who try climbing it to the point that they run out crying. Great Great Uncle Zeb placed a secret at the top of the tower on how to stop a Nossix. It is located in Near Under within Hotfrog Forest.
Kiosk of Random Opportunity - A Wheel of Fortune-like spinner with careers on it instead of amounts of money. When someone spins it, whichever career it lands on becomes that person's new career and they are instantly teleported there.
Valley of the Zinkas - An abandon "lost" ruins of a society now gone. They were chocolatiers, taffy-pullers, and candy fans that ate nothing but sweets. Before dying out, they left behind a giant orb of gumlacose in a booby-trapped maze with a guardian monster.

Species

Anthropomorphic creatures
There are a variety of creatures who are quite intelligent and can be considered the "people" of Under (the world). Some species are common while others are rare to the point that only one or two members have been seen on the show, most of these rare creatures aren't listed here. Many species haven't been given canonical names and the majority of this section is conjectural.

Underites - (various species) The inhabitants of the 'Kingdom' of Under (as opposed to the continent of Under or the entire Planet of Under, which plays host to various nationalities). Some people inhabiting certain areas of Under don't think of themselves as Underites, but as Florians, Outties, etc.
Near Underites - (various species) The inhabitants of the Kingdom of Near Under, unlike Underites, the majority of Near Underites seem to be members of the Bulb-Headed Species).
Throngegerians - (various species) The inhabitants of Throng, the town on Ahead of Under. Known for their cleanliness and of being afraid of almost everything, especially germs.
Loopy's Species - One of the more common species (particularly in Under), with other notable members being Captain Darling, Mr. Queep, and Hugh the Yu-Yu. This species is characterized by high foreheads, large bulbous noses, and protruding jowls.
"Populah's Species" - As juveniles (such as ex-Princess Populah), members of this species have no discernible noses, growing them later in life (such as Auntie First). Because this species is identical to Loopy's Species in adulthood, it is unknown how abundant or how rare it is in comparison. Because of the similarities, it could even be possible that both people are subspecies of one single race. Certain members of this species can breathe underwater (Populah, Cousin Tess), but it sometimes 'skips' a generation (as it did with Auntie First).
Wire Guys - Sentient bundles of barbed wire taking a vaguely humanoid appearance (eyeballs on stalks extending up from the head, tails, two arms, and two legs). Like cyborgs, Wire Guys are very resilient and can use their coiled-wire form to extends limbs, filter through tight spaces, or even be totally unwound. Bob Wire is the only Wire Guy seen in the show, although a photo of his mother (a barbed wire fence) has been seen. This could mean that once Wire Guys 'die' they become normal inanimate wire. Bob also refers to himself as 'the Wire Man'. Being made of metal as well, he's also immune to organic ailments.
Frags - Small green creatures with two arms and two legs, small tails, and small shark-like dorsal fins on the backs of their heads. Bob Wire's henchmen are both Frags (although there were originally three), and aren't called anything other than "Frags". They usually have high nasal voices, but sometimes their voices go low to emphasize certain words in their sentences.
Sock boys - A race of cowboys that inhabit the wild-western Argyle Flats. They're woven sentient socks.
Bulb-Headed Species - A common race very similar to Loopy's Species, but whose foreheads are shaped like lightbulbs (Loopy's Species have flat foreheads that taper off to a rounded dome). They reside mostly in Near Under.
Yu-Yus - Small creatures (about the size of frags) that inhabit Under Under. They are usually white (somewhat resembling living marshmallows) with spiky hair that can't be discerned from the rest of their bodies. At least one blue Yu-Yu has been depicted in the show. Like their leader Hugh the Yu-Yu, actual Yu-Yus love to party and tame giant Slythers, earning themselves a reputation of being fierce and terrifying party animals.
Guardilators - Large hulking people in the service of King Lugobrius Rex. They are tall with very muscular torsos and arms, and they have no noses.
Florians - Plant people. Two notable factions, the Red Florians and the Yellow Florians had been waging a never-ending war over the last Thussle Bush. They communicate through smells and bursts of pollen.
Cyborgs - Robots such as Vernon, who was built by the Clockmaker. The Hermit who lives on the moon may also be a cyborg since he appears to only be an upper torso with garbage can making up his lower portions and the usage of a single small wheel for locomotion. However, unlike Vernon, whose legs (also terminating in wheels) and arms can grow, the Clockmaker acts much more human (except his mode of transportation). Vernon can also extend his glasses to use them as microscopes or binoculars. Sometimes when his glasses are removed he is shown to not possess eyes behind them, while other times the eyes are very small. Because they are inorganic, they are unaffected by organic ailments and the Horrorborealis.
Outties - The inhabitants of Outieville, they all have "outie" belly buttons.
Ipples - The inhabitants of a small and secluded jungle village. They are unable to make decisions for themselves, preferring to ask either Loopy ("The Great Decider" of Ipple lore) and later a butterflier (on Loopy's instructions).
Juice Beasts- Sentient creatures who can squirt juice out of their tentacles. One of the most popular locations in Under is the Juice Beast Stand, which serves as a major social gathering place (like a pub). The second most popular place is the Wriggly Pie Stand.
Nossixs - Creatures that can change between being very small and weak to very big and muscle-bound while wearing wear lederhosens. Great-great Uncle Zed once defeated a Nossix and locked it away in a bongo drum until Bob Wire used the Nossix to chase Russell out of the kingdom.
Ghouls - Any creature (sentient and non-sentient) during the Horrorborealis. They are zombie-like creatures that have an uncontrollable craving for pickles. They must be kept away from pickles until the Horrorborealis is over because if they eat them, they will remain Ghouls permanently. Being made of metal or having an invincible electro aura can keep you safe from glorification.

 Miscellaneous creatures 

Sky-cow – A flying cow-like creature. Russell and his friends use these as transportation regularly.
Squirt Hog aka "Engene" - An elephant creature that filled with water and a trunk nozzle to squirt. They're usually used for watering eggs to grow into buildings and other construction structures.
Greenback – A green frog-like creature that was once used as currency when Russell attempted to introduce money to Under. When Bob took control of all the greenbacks, making Under destitute, Russell repealed money, which made the greenbacks worthless.
Sky-beast – A more commonly used creature used as transportation by Bob Wire and Auntie First. They have handlebar-like horns and saddles which are generally used for this purpose by their riders.
Slyther – A large raptor-like creature with a shovel-like mouth used for digging. Many are domesticated, ridden as transport, and milked to make Slyther Cheese by the Yu-Yus.
Night-slyther – Although it sounds like a relative to the common Slyther, it is more monstrous-looking than the more common Slyther. It looks like a big green ball with multiple eyes, tentacles, long arms with claws and mouths on them, as well as a big spiky mouth on its body. They use to living in the shadows of Under Under hence would only emerge overground at night.
Corola Vines - Similar looking to Night-Slythers but are carnivorous plants. Native to the Flatulent Swamps. On Pollen Holiday, their "hand-vines" grow excessively outward of the swamp to catch prey but are eaten by a migration of giant sea herbivores. Auntie First grows one in her greenhouse.
Thoosh – A large walrus-like creature native to Wall-Eye Lake. It spouts jet-water to instantly grow Tither Ferns and eat them. Its water can also instantly clean places.
Asymtote – A large monster that normally harmless. When hungry, every step it takes is half the length of its previous step before it (to conserve energy). It feeds on seaweed. It is also called 'A Monster that Never Arrives'. It also seems to be constantly humming a tone-deaf tune that induces high stress.
Rebuloc – A vicious badger-like creature native to the Flatulent Swamp. Avoid.
Blue Bird of Happenstance – A large blue bird with beak and eyes in reversed position (beak above eyes). Whoever it poops on is cursed with bad luck for a year. Its feathers bring good luck.
Krenit – The ultimate defensive beast. It has a large body, multiple eyes to spot prey, and a super-fast sticky tongue that grabs anything it touches. You'll need slow plums to outrun a krenit, otherwise, you must stay absolutely still to avoid its tongue.
Ippy Clippy – The ultimate offensive beast. It is the natural enemy of the Krenit. It has eyes on stalks, a large club-like tail, and two huge Popeye-like arms. It was so dangerous that they were run out of the continent. Great-great-uncle Zeb beat the last Ippy Clippy of Under and hid it inside the Wall Eye. Bob Wire rehydrated it to stomp Near Under's Krenit but it was beaten up by two Krenits.
Slorch – A large red furry creature that can breathe fire. They only eat spicy hot peppers (from its home, the Hot Pepper Jungle) and need to live hot climates. They can also talk.
Plurn – A large one-eyed squid-like fish. Baby Plurns live on land and breathe air, then the mother squirts them with ink and they turn into aquatic adults. The Plurn ink can also turn other land animals into fish-like creatures. Later in life, Plurns swim into the underwater Volcano Metamorpho and are erupted with wings, living the rest of their lives in the sky. Going into the volcano will return Plurned (ink-squirted) creatures back to their normal terrestrial selves.
Spitesucker – A red leech-like creature. It feeds on anger. Once it is attached to someone, the only way to get it off is for the person to get so angry that the spitesucker flies off because of overload.
Dream Gulper – A strange gelatinous creature. It can make dreams and nightmares real. If reality isn't corrected by sundown it becomes permanent.
Gorble Birds – Hideous blue-birds with udders. They poop out gross smelly organic pink slop. They usually migrate to Near Under.
Sea Clutch – A small fish-like creature. It got its name because it grabs things in its clutches.
Rock Monkey - A monkey-like creature. Its arms are where its nose is supposed to be. Its favorite food is pumpernickel.
Sea Sloth - A sloth-like creature native to the sea.
Jelly Droppers - Large hovering jellyfish-like creatures. They drop huge balls of blue jelly. Cousin Tess uses them as heavy assault bombers.
Skiffer Skink - A bloodhound-like creature with a pig's snout. Once it locks on a certain scent, it will never give up on the target.
Great Big Hairy Eye-Ball - A floating hairy eye that temporarily turns anyone who looks directly at it into stone. Its only weakness is being squirted in the eye with the juice of SourSquirt Berries.
Bedrock Beast - A large, stout caterpillar-like creature that eats any kind of rock or rock-derived material, such as brick houses.
Parabat - A flying manta ray-like creature. It is used as a parasail on Frolicking Island.
Sharkrunner - A red dinosaur-like creature with a shark-like head and a shark fin. It is used to pull the Parabat on Frolicking Island.
Squump - A dumb, lazy cow-like creature. It gives both eggs and milk which are used for certain food products such as wriggly pies. When they get old, they leave to go spend their golden years in retirement. When that happens Slaphappies show up and cause trouble. The only way to get rid of Slaphappies is to get a new herd of squumps. To get a new herd you have to wrangle the herd leader which is usually the biggest and meanest Bull Squump. Bull Squumps have bull horns.
Fang Ferret - A small ferret like creature with sharp fangs and a strong bite. Used at Miss Atilla's school for part of dispute battles between students.
Donkey Horse - A donkey-like horse. They are treated like real horses in Argyle Flats.
Gigagut - A giant stomach monster. It eats almost everything. It can't swim according to Populah since she said it would go to Near Under, then Under, then Under Under. This also reveals it can burrow. Consuming Vegidoubles of Quackvain Bushes makes it belches everything it had consumed.
Slaphappy - An incessantly happy creature who loves playing pranks on townsfolk. Their natural enemy are Squumps since they're the only thing that will get rid of them. They come in four colors; red, orange, blue, and green.
Pool Clam - A clam-like creature with three tongues that look like hands. They are quite common on Frolicking Island''.
Piranha Moth - A savage moth-like creature that eats clothing. It can eat people's clothes to their underwear.
Skitchybug - A tiny blue bee like creature that swarms around people as pests.
Brainsucker - A moving lump of flesh. They jump on people's heads and make them dumb as squumps. Loopy is curiously immune to this. Brainsuckers are afraid of light and only come out of their nest during the month-long eclipse.
Ice Eel - Small flying eels that inhabit the Equatorial Glaciers, moving through the cracks in the ice.
Pudrick - A small purple monster that acts as a "blame sponge". Unless blamed continually for everything that goes wrong, it will transform into a gargantuan creature and run amok.
Fhrobish - Small, weasel-like creature. Its bite can cause Monsteritis.
Fhrobish victims - Underites and humans that contracted Monsteritis from a Fhrobish, having changed into monsters.
Dongo Worm - A giant worm that lives in the Uncertain City in Near Under.  Anyone with Monsteritis needs to eat some of its mouth slime to revert to normal.
Pilf - Tiny creature that looks vaguely like a rat with a robber's mask on. Fond of stealing anything and everything they can get their hands on.
Lurber - Enormous plant creature with a highly specific diet: it only eats Kings. Its fronds (referred to as a "head-lawn") must be kept trimmed to keep the creature dormant.
Guardgoyle - Vicious bulldog-like creature used as a royal guardian. It will obey the King of Under, whoever is wearing the crown that is.
Hammer Rhino - Large animals that can be ridden and/or used as Battering Rams.
Omnivorous Fatloid - A large obese gluttonous creature that inhabits the new garbage dump of Under, Glass Box Canyon.  Since they are omnivorous, they will eat anything, including garbage and people.
Dandilinium Vartibrus - A rare species of butterfly found in Under.
Noflier - Another rare species of butterfly in Under. Sought by Mr. Queep in Ipple territory.
Sea Scarf - Large aquatic creatures that migrate through the Edible Archipelago. They have sweet teeth and while they will eat Dessert Islands they will leave Salad Islands be. They also don't like marzipan.
The Great Big Gehh - A mountain-sized snakelike creature that inhabits the Valley of the Outies.
Shine Toad - In infant stage, they look like glowing frogs before metamorphosis. Later, transforms into large green feathery beings.
Doubler - A mass of sentient green slime that can morph into any creature it wants to, even going so far as to copy a person's voice and mannerisms.
Geet - A Giant creature that vaguely resemble a land-dwelling kraken. The adult Geet will use its giant tongue to catch food, ranging from people to cheese, pulling them back to its giant nest where the prey gets attached to the ceiling. The baby Geets then hatch and spit digestive enzymes onto the food until they liquefy and are then drunk by the babies.
Gurd - A large swimming and walking creature that will eat people and then lay them as eggs. When the people hatch, they get imprinted and obsessed over the first thing they see.
Dart Bird - Crane-like birds that are fired from crossbows, carrying letters in their claws. They travel great distances as Under's main courier service, even to Up.
Monster Skiddadle Spray - Rabbits that spray repentant at monsters to chase them away. But they don't work on Bedrock Beasts though.
Esculizard - Alligators with stairs in their mouths that revolve like escalators. Seen in the Big Cloud Mall.
Squirt Pigs - Small pigs filled with paint to colorize anything. They can both squirt and mist color out like a spray can and hose.
Excavator Camel- An all-terrain beast that Populah once used to help bring a Slorch back in its home.
Hole Beast - A creature with a portal hole on its chest. Jumping through the holes will transport him/her to anywhere randomly, to another hole beast or distant place. You never know.
Gob Shooter - A monster used to dirty up Under in one of Bob's schemes.
Triviper - A three-headed snake that was used by Aunti First and Captain Darling to try and capture a giant worm. It wraps its tail around its target and snaps at its face.
Spitballer - A monster used to dirty up Under in one of Bob's schemes.
Foot Launcher - A monster used to dirty up Under in one of Bob's schemes.
Megaphone Speaker - A megaphone creature whose mouth moves to whatever is being said or broadcast with it.
Living Furniture - Living chairs, tables, ottomans, stools, scales, lamps, and many other things. Primarily seen in Under's castle. Some furniture isn't alive, such as Throne and Auntie First's desk.

Gadgets ('Gizmets') 
Gadgets are referred to in Under as 'Gizmets'.
Enlargulator - A device created by Vernon (based on one he saw in the Museum of Tomorrow) to enlarge King to a size capable of deflecting Under's Moon from its current course, which would cause it to crash into Under.
Smalluator - The opposite of an Enlargulator.
King Car - Under's first automobile. Driven off a cliff into a canyon to prevent Auntie First and Bob Wire from reverse-engineering it.
Big Cloud Mall - Flying mall, uses "stinks" as fuel. Once a bottled resource stink is used up, it is immediately dumped to the ground below, and the crew of the mall makes home movies of its splash.
Drilling Rocket - Rocket drill that burrows through the earth.
Eye-Looker and Eye-Looker Screen - Reminiscent of a periscope, but with video feed.
Gargantubob - A mecha built by Bob Wire (when he was Smartulated) to look like himself and help him take over Under. It runs on Swamp Gas.
Grim Balloon - The hot air balloon Loopy used to attack Under when he was masquerading as The Grim. It is shaped as the Grim's head.
Outty spotlight - The Batman-esque spotlight the Outties of Outtieville shine on the clouds to call in help from the King (Cliff).
Resmartulator - A device created to reverse the effects of Brain-Sucker attachment. Also capable of dramatically increasing the intelligence of normal individuals it is used on. It is solar-powered, which means during an eclipse (which is when brain-suckers come out and the Resmartulator is generally used) it can only be used a certain number of times before it runs out of power.
Everything Log - A hollowed log that can provide a wish to anyone who places their hand inside it.

Episodes 

52 episodes were produced over two seasons.

References

External links

2000s Canadian animated television series
2003 Canadian television series debuts
2005 Canadian television series endings
Animated television series about children
Canadian children's animated adventure television series
Canadian children's animated comedy television series
Canadian children's animated fantasy television series
English-language television shows
Fantasy comedy television series
Family Channel (Canadian TV network) original programming
Television series by DHX Media
Canadian Screen Award-winning television shows